The 2002 Exide Batteries 2 Hour Showroom Showdown was an endurance race for Australian GT Production Cars. The event was staged at the Mount Panorama Circuit, Bathurst, New South Wales, Australia on Saturday 16 November 2002 as a support event on program for the 2002 Bathurst 24 Hour. Since 1997 the Bathurst Showroom Showdown had been the lead support race for the Bathurst 1000 but moved to the 24 Hour was promoted and run by the same PROCAR organisation.

Entry list was smaller as some teams chose to race in the 24 Hour race so the Mirage Cup was added to the eligibility.

The race was won by Gary Young and Michael Brock driving a Mitsubishi Lancer RS-E Evolution VI won the race by 15 seconds ahead of the similar Mitsubishi Lancer RS-E Evolution VII driven by Graham Alexander and John Woodberry with the Mazda RX-7 Turbo of Bob Pearson and Mark Brame finishing third.

Class structure
Cars competed in the following three classes:
Class A : GT-Performance class cars
Class B : GT-Production class cars
Class C : Mitsubishi Mirage Cup

Results

References

 Natsoft Race Result*

Motorsport in Bathurst, New South Wales
Exide